Artur Bugaj (born October 22, 1970) is a Polish football player who currently plays for Darzbór Szczecinek of the Polish fourth league.

He initially was on the books at Wisła Kraków, but did not play a game there. He played in the second league for Cracovia in 1989/90. Having scored 40 goals by the 1995/96 season, he declined in form until 2000/01 when he spent two seasons in the second division, in GKS Bełchatów and Lech Poznań.

References

1970 births
Living people
Polish footballers
Wisła Kraków players
MKS Cracovia (football) players
Pogoń Szczecin players
Amica Wronki players
Dyskobolia Grodzisk Wielkopolski players
ŁKS Łódź players
GKS Bełchatów players
Lech Poznań players
Ekstraklasa players
People from Szczecinek
Sportspeople from West Pomeranian Voivodeship
Association football forwards